Jim Grabb and Richey Reneberg were the defending champions, but Grabb did not compete this year. Reneberg teamed up with Chris Woodruff and lost in the first round to Michael Tebbutt and Mikael Tillström.

Tebbutt and Tillström won the title by defeating Jonas Björkman and Nicklas Kulti 6–3, 6–2 in the final.

Seeds
The first four seeds received a bye into the second round.

Draw

Finals

Top half

Bottom half

References

External links
 Official results archive (ATP)
 Official results archive (ITF)

1997 ATP Tour